William, Will, Bill, or Billy Parks may refer to:

 William Parks (publisher), (1699–1750) eighteenth century colonial America printer and publisher
 William Parks (paleontologist) (1868–1936), Canadian geologist and paleontologist
 William Parks (baseball) (1885–?), American baseball player
 William Parks (Alamo defender)
 William Parks (sailor) (1921–2008), American Olympic sailor
 Bill Parks (1849–1911), American baseball player and manager
 Billy Parks (1948–2009), American football player
 Will Parks (born 1994), American football player

See also
William Park (disambiguation)